Sanford is a census-designated place (CDP) in Accomack County, Virginia, United States. It was first listed as a CDP in 2010. Per the 2020 census, the population was 168.

Pocomoke Farm was added to the National Register of Historic Places in 2007.

Geography
It lies at an elevation of 3 feet.

Demographics

2020 census

Note: the US Census treats Hispanic/Latino as an ethnic category. This table excludes Latinos from the racial categories and assigns them to a separate category. Hispanics/Latinos can be of any race.

References

Virginia Trend Report 2: State and Complete Places (Sub-state 2010 Census Data)

Census-designated places in Accomack County, Virginia
Census-designated places in Virginia